Filfili (also, Bash-Fil’filli, Filfilli, and Filifli) is a village and municipality in the Oghuz Rayon of Azerbaijan.  It has a population of 749.

References

See also
Aşağı Filfili, "Lower Filfili"

Populated places in Oghuz District